For many years, the Columbus New Mexico Port of Entry was the gateway for New Mexico's only border town.  The US government first built a Customs inspection station in Columbus, New Mexico in 1902.  In 1916, that building was damaged during a raid by bandits led by Pancho Villa.  The building has been refurbished and stands as part of Pancho Villa State Park.

After the Second World War, a one-story barracks (used by the personnel assigned to the U.S. Army's Air Base Columbus during the War) was moved to the southwest corner of the intersection of Route 11 (the Deming-Palomas road) and Route 9 (the Columbus-Hachita road). The first two rooms of this building were used by the U.S. Immigration Service Inspectors to inspect aliens who were applying for lawful admission to the United States and to provide administrative workspace for the Immigration Service and the Border Patrol.  In 1946, the remainder of the building was converted into living accommodations for one of the Inspectors and his family.  Three Inspectors were assigned to the office which was open, initially from 8:00 am to 8:00 pm and later from 6:00 am to 10:00 pm.  When the Pancho Villa State Park was opened next to the site, a new Immigration/Customs building was built three miles south at the border and the former office building/residence became a town library and public meeting room.  From 1902 until this was done, A U.S. Customs Service inspection building stood on the northwest corner of the RT-9/RT-11 intersection and a house west of it was the residence for many years of Chief Customs Inspector Jack Breen and his wife Susie. That building is now a museum.

The current border inspection station was built by the General Services Administration in 1989.  GSA has plans to replace it once again.

References

See also

 List of Mexico–United States border crossings
 List of Canada–United States border crossings

Mexico–United States border crossings
1902 establishments in New Mexico Territory
Buildings and structures completed in 1902
Buildings and structures in Luna County, New Mexico